Chil Sar (also Romanized as Chīl Sar; also known as Chehel Sar) is a village in Polan Rural District, Polan District, Chabahar County, Sistan and Baluchestan Province, Iran. At the 2006 census, its population was 398, in 52 families.

References 

Populated places in Chabahar County